Ole Enger may refer to:

 Ole Enger (chief executive), Norwegian president and CEO of Renewable Energy Corporation
 Ole Enger (actor) (1948–2014), Norwegian actor and businessman